Line 3 of the Xi'an Metro is a rapid transit line running from northeast to southwest Xi'an, linking Xi'an International Trade & Logistics Park in the northwest through Xi'an Economic & Technological Development Zone to Yuhuazhai in the southwest. Line 3 is one of the three lines that form the main framework of Xi'an metro. Phase 1 of Line 3 was opened on November 8, 2016, with 19 underground stations and 7 overground stations. Phase 2 is still under planning. The line is colored pink on system maps.

Opening timeline

Stations (from south to north)

Future development
Phase 2
Phase 2 of Line 3 is still in long-term planning. It will be an extension from the southwest terminus of Phase 1, Yuhuazhai station to Kunmingchi station (tentatively named).

Rolling stock
The rolling stock consists solely of CNR DKZ17 trains manufactured by CNR Dalian, 41 trainsets will be provided as per the first contract. The trains run in six-car formation, with four motor cars and two trailer cars, which is different from previous trains (running in 3-3 formation), as more power is required to drive the trains up the ramp from underground to overground sections.

Train Control
Line 3, as all the previous lines, uses Trainguard MT CBTC signal system manufactured by Siemens to enhance the safety of the automated, driverless trains.

Incidents

Defective cable incident
On 13 March 2017, a post titled Do you still dare to take the Xi'an Metro? was posted by an anonymous whistle-blower on an online forum. The poster claimed that the electrical cables used on Line 3 of Xi'an Metro, which were produced by Shaanxi Aokai Electrical Cables (Aokai Cables), did not meet the safety criteria, specifically, the cross-sectional area was smaller than specified, which might lead to overheating of the cables, therefore presenting a fire hazard.

On 15 March, Aokai Cables released a statement that the claims were unfounded and they have filed a police report.

On 16 March, the official Xi'an Metro Weibo account announced that they had launched an official investigation and an internal audit. On the same day, the government of Xi'an pledged to investigate the matter.

On 20 March, the government of Xi'an told a press conference that none out of five cable samples sampled were of acceptable quality.

In the wake of the incident, 8 members of staff from Aokai cables were arrested and disciplinary actions were taken against 122 local officials, including 8 bureau-directors and 58 division heads.

Notes

References 

03
Railway lines opened in 2016
2016 establishments in China